A cylinder is a basic curvilinear geometric shape.

Cylinder may also refer to:

 Cylinder (algebra), the Cartesian product of a set with its superset
 Cylinder (disk drive), a division of data in a disk drive
 Cylinder (engine), the space in which a piston travels in an engine
 Cylinder (firearms), the rotating part of a revolver containing multiple chambers
 Cylinder (gastropod), a subgenus of sea snails
 Cylinder (locomotive), the components that convert steam power into motion
 Cylinder (optometry)
 Cylinder, Iowa, a city in Palo Alto County, Iowa, United States
 Cylinder set, a natural basic set in product spaces
 Cylinder set measure, a way to generate a measure over product spaces
 Gas cylinder, a high-strength container for storing gases at high pressure
 Phonograph cylinder, the earliest commercial medium for recording and reproducing sound

See also
 Cylindera, a genus of ground beetles